Nannophryne apolobambica is a species of toad in the family Bufonidae. It is endemic to Bolivia and only known from its type locality on the banks of Pelechuco River, Cordillera Apolobamba, in the Franz Tamayo Province of northwestern Bolivia.
Its natural habitat is tropical cloud forest. Active toads were found on the forest floor and paths both day and night. It is threatened by habitat loss. The type locality is partly within the Madidi National Park.

References

apolobambica
Amphibians of the Andes
Amphibians of Bolivia
Endemic fauna of Bolivia
Taxonomy articles created by Polbot
Amphibians described in 2005